Iwayato Dam  is a gravity dam located in Miyazaki Prefecture in Japan. The dam is used for power production. The catchment area of the dam is 355.7 km2. The dam impounds about 39  ha of land when full and can store 8309 thousand cubic meters of water. The construction of the dam was started on 1920 and completed in 1941.

See also
List of dams in Japan

References

Dams in Miyazaki Prefecture